Murdi may refer to:
 Murdi, Bushehr
 Murdi, East Azerbaijan
 Murdi, Fars
 Murdi, Kohgiluyeh and Boyer-Ahmad
 Murdi: Village in Pindra tehsil, India.